Combat Logistics Regiment 37 (formerly Headquarters Regiment), 3rd MLG is a logistics regiment of the United States Marine Corps.  It is part of the 3rd Marine Logistics Group and III Marine Expeditionary Force (III MEF). The unit is based out of the Marine Corps Base Camp Kinser, Okinawa, Japan.

Mission
Provide command and control, administration, communications, food services, and services support to the Marine Logistics Group (MLG) Command Element (CE).

Subordinate units 

 Combat Logistics Company 33
 Combat Logistics Company 36
 Expeditionary Contracting Platoon

History
This unit was formerly known as Headquarters Battalion, 3rd Force Service Support Group (FSSG) but officially changed its designation to Combat Logistics Regiment 37, 3rd Marine Logistics Group (MLG) on October 20, 2006.  The unit changed its designation on September 30, 2014 to Headquarters Regiment, 3rd MLG; but was then redesignated back to Combat Logistics Regiment 37 on November 4, 2018.

See also

 List of United States Marine Corps regiments
 Organization of the United States Marine Corps

External links
 CLR-37's official website
 https://www.3rdmlg.marines.mil/Units/Subordinate-Units/Headquarters-Regiment/CLR-37-CO/

Combat logistics regiments of the United States Marine Corps